Dan Champagne is an American politician currently serving as a Connecticut State senator representing the 35th District. Which encompasses various towns in Northeastern Connecticut. Champagne was first elected in 2018 and is a member of the Republican Party. Champagne also serves as mayor of Vernon, Connecticut.

Political career
Champagne ran for the 35th District seat in 2018 in order to replace the retiring Anthony Guglielmo. Champagne would later win the election in a thin two point margin over Democratic challenger John Perrier. Champagne was re-elected in 2020 by an even thinner one point margin over Democrat Lisa Thomas. Champagne has been assigned to committees such as the Judiciary and the Planning and Development Committee. Champagne is also the current Ranking Member of the Public Safety and Security Committee. While in the Senate, Champagne has opposed bills legalizing marijuana in the state of Connecticut.

References

External links

Living people
21st-century American politicians
Republican Party Connecticut state senators
Mayors of places in Connecticut
Connecticut city council members
Eastern Connecticut State University alumni
University of Connecticut alumni
People from Vernon, Connecticut
Year of birth missing (living people)